The following is the list of Malayalam films released in 2007. It does not include film festival screenings.

Films

Dubbed films

References

 2007
2007
Lists of 2007 films by country or language
2007 in Indian cinema